Hamstall Ridware is a civil parish in the district of Lichfield, Staffordshire, England.  It contains 19 listed buildings that are recorded in the National Heritage List for England.  Of these, one is at Grade I, the highest of the three grades, three are at Grade II*, the middle grade, and the others are at Grade II, the lowest grade.  The parish contains the village of Hamstall Ridware and the surrounding countryside.  In the village was a mansion that has been largely demolished and replaced by a newer house.  The remaining buildings associated with the original house, namely a gatehouse, a tower and associated walls, are listed together with the later house and other structures associated with it.  Also in the village is a church, with crosses and memorials in the churchyard, that are listed.  The other listed buildings are houses, cottages, and farmhouses, the earlier of which are timber framed or have timber framed cores.


Key

Buildings

References

Citations

Sources

Lists of listed buildings in Staffordshire